Pseudaechmea is a genus of the botanical family Bromeliaceae, subfamily Bromelioideae. The genus name is from the Greek pseudos (false) and the genus Aechmea. The genus was established by Lyman Smith and R.W. Read in 1982. The sole species is Pseudaechmea ambigua, treated as a synonym of Billbergia ambigua by Plants of the World Online .

External links
BSI Genera Gallery photos

Notes

Bromelioideae
Bromeliaceae genera
Monotypic Poales genera